John William Maule Ramsay, 13th Earl of Dalhousie,  (29 January 1847 – 25 November 1887), styled Lord Ramsay between 1874 and 1880, was a Scottish naval commander, courtier and Liberal politician. He served as Secretary for Scotland in William Ewart Gladstone's short-lived 1886 administration.

Early life
Dalhousie was born at Aberdour House at Fraserburgh, Aberdeenshire on 29 January 1847. He was the eldest son of Admiral George Ramsay, 12th Earl of Dalhousie, and Sarah Frances, daughter of William Robertson of Logan House. The Hon. Charles Maule Ramsay, MP for Forfarshire, was his younger brother. He gained the courtesy title of Lord Ramsay in 1874 when his father succeeded in the earldom of Dalhousie on the death of his first cousin, Fox Maule-Ramsay, 11th Earl of Dalhousie.

His paternal grandfather was The Hon. John Ramsay (the fourth son of George Ramsay, 8th Earl of Dalhousie).

After attending Charterhouse School, he matriculated at Balliol College, Oxford in 1875.

Career
Dalhousie followed his father into the Royal Navy, where he served from 1861 to 1879, achieving the rank of Commander. He was Equerry to the Duke of Edinburgh between 1874 and 1876 and an Extra Equerry between 1876 and 1880.

Political career

Dalhousie was elected Liberal Member of Parliament for Liverpool in March 1880, but was forced to resign in July 1880 after succeeding his father in the earldom. After taking his seat in the House of Lords he was appointed a Lord-in-waiting in September 1880 by William Ewart Gladstone, a position he held until the government fell in 1885.

In April 1886 he succeeded George Trevelyan (who had resigned over Irish Home Rule) as Secretary for Scotland in Gladstone's short-lived 1886 administration, although in contrast to Trevelyan he was not a member of the cabinet. He was sworn of the Privy Council at the same time. He retained this post until the government fell in July 1886. He was made a Knight of the Thistle in 1881.

Personal life
On 6 December 1877, Lord Dalhousie was married to Lady Ida Louisa Bennet. She was a daughter of Charles Bennet, 6th Earl of Tankerville and Olivia Bennet, Countess of Tankerville (eldest daughter of George Montagu, 6th Duke of Manchester).  Together, Lord and Lady Dalhousie had five sons:

 Arthur George Maule Ramsay, 14th Earl of Dalhousie (1878–1928), who married Lady Mary Heathcote-Drummond, a daughter of Gilbert Heathcote-Drummond-Willoughby, 1st Earl of Ancaster, on 14 July 1903.
 The Hon. Sir Patrick Ramsay (1879–1962), who married Dorothy Surtees on 15 October 1917.
 Adm. The Hon. Sir Alexander Robert Maule Ramsay (1881–1972), who married Princess Patricia of Connaught, a granddaughter of Queen Victoria, on 27 February 1919.
 The Hon. Charles Fox Maule Ramsay (1885–1926), who married Aline Rose Arbuthnot-Leslie, eldest of George Arbuthnot-Leslie of Warthill, in 1919. After his death, she married Maj. Hon. Arthur Michael Cosmo Bertie (a son of Montagu Bertie, 7th Earl of Abingdon).
 Lt. Hon. Ronald Edward Maule Ramsay (1885–1909), who died unmarried.

After returning from a trip to the United States in November 1887, the couple were forced to break off their journey in Le Havre after Lady Dalhousie was taken ill. Despite medical attention she died of peritonitis on 24 November, aged 30. After retiring to bed the same night, Lord Dalhousie never awoke, having apparently suffered from an apoplectic fit during the night, thus surviving his wife by less than 24 hours, dying at age 40.

References

Sources
 Torrance, David, The Scottish Secretaries (Birlinn 2006)

External links
 

1847 births
1887 deaths
Earls of Dalhousie
Secretaries for Scotland
Knights of the Thistle
Liberal Party (UK) MPs for English constituencies
Liberal Party (UK) Lords-in-Waiting
UK MPs 1880–1885
Dalhousie, E13
John
Members of the Privy Council of the United Kingdom
Members of the Parliament of the United Kingdom for Liverpool